Lake Vrana in Dalmatia is the largest lake in Croatia. It is a designated nature park (park prirode), a kind of protected area in Croatia. It is located in Zadar County and Šibenik-Knin County, between the towns and municipalities of Benkovac, Pirovac, Pakoštane, Stankovci and Tisno.

Description

The lake is in a karst valley filled with water and is a rare example cryptodepression. The dominant feature of the park is a special ornithological reserve, an almost untouched natural habitat of birds, a rare wetland systems, full of high biodiversity and an outstanding scientific and ecological value. The lake provides an ample amount of fish for fishing enthusiasts.

See also
 Protected areas of Croatia

References

Further reading

External links
 

Nature parks of Croatia
Ramsar sites in Croatia
Landforms of Zadar County
Landforms of Šibenik-Knin County
Vrana
Protected areas of Zadar County
Protected areas of Šibenik-Knin County